Makwa is a village in the Canadian province of Saskatchewan within the Rural Municipality of Loon Lake No. 561 and Census Division No. 17.

History 
Makwa incorporated as a village on June 1, 1965.

Demographics 

See also
List of communities in Saskatchewan
List of villages in Saskatchewan

References

Villages in Saskatchewan
Loon Lake No. 561, Saskatchewan
Division No. 17, Saskatchewan